Paracyrtophyllus excelsus, known generally as the chisos katydid or big bend quonker, is a species of true katydid in the family Tettigoniidae. It is found in North America.

References

Pseudophyllinae
Articles created by Qbugbot
Insects described in 1914